Baker Shoal Range Rear Lighthouse is a lighthouse in Delaware, United States, on the Delaware River, near Port Penn.

History
Baker Shoal Range Rear Lighthouse originally served as the Port Penn-Reedy Island Range Rear Light in Port Penn. It became the Baker Shoal Range Rear Light in 1904 when the old range was discontinued due to the channel moving.  It is an active aid to navigation.

Head keepers
 Willard H. Hall 1904 – 1906
 Benjamin Burton 1906
 Harry F. Hann 1906 – 1908
 Harry E. Spencer, Sr. 1908 – 1913
 William Harrington 1913 – 1915
 Fred C. Hill 1917 – 1924

See also

 List of lighthouses in Delaware
 List of lighthouses in the United States

References

 

Lighthouses completed in 1896
Lighthouses in New Castle County, Delaware